Settled Out of Court is a 1925 British silent drama film directed by George A. Cooper and starring Fay Compton, Jack Buchanan and Jeanne de Casalis. The screenplay involves a husband whose attempts to escape from a loveless marriage end in tragedy.

Cast
 Fay Compton as The Woman 
 Jack Buchanan as The Husband 
 Jeanne de Casalis as The Wife 
 Leon Quartermaine as The Russian 
 Kinsey Peile as The Count 
 Malcolm Keen as The Detective

References

External links
 

1925 films
Films directed by George A. Cooper
1925 drama films
British drama films
British silent feature films
British black-and-white films
1920s English-language films
1920s British films
Silent drama films